Sarisophora tenella is a moth in the Lecithoceridae family. It is found in India and Australia.

The wingspan is 9–10 mm. The forewings are dark brown.

References

Animals described in 1919
tenella